Andrei Sergeyevich Mozharovsky (born 25 July 1994) is a Russian football player. He also holds Ukrainian citizenship as Andriy Serhiyovych Mozharovsky.

Club career
He made his debut in the Russian Professional Football League for FC Luki-Energiya Velikiye Luki on 1 September 2017 in a game against FC Kolomna.

References

External links
 Profile by Russian Professional Football League

1994 births
People from Irkutsk Oblast
Sportspeople from Irkutsk Oblast
Living people
Russian footballers
Ukrainian footballers
FC Metalurh-2 Zaporizhzhia players
Russian expatriate footballers
Expatriate footballers in Lithuania
FK Tauras Tauragė players
Association football midfielders